Strategicon or Strategikon may refer to:

 The Strategikon of Maurice, a sixth-century Byzantine manual of war
 The Strategikon of Kekaumenos, an eleventh-century Byzantine manual of war
 Strategicon (gaming conventions), a series held in California